Chabba Sindhwan (Urdu : چبہ‌سندھواں) is a village and union council in Tehsil Nowshera Virkan, District Gujranwala, Punjab, Pakistan. This historical village is located in the west of Gujranwala city. It's a major village having about 4000-6000 population estimated (2020). Village is famous due to its ravines streets.

Geography
Chabba Sindhwan it located 32.0785 N,73.8728 E, west of Gujranwala city in Gujranwala District, Punjab, Pakistan. Villages around the Chabba Sindhwan are;
Nokhar, Nadan Kot and Chak Virkan in East
Jallan and Dera Shah Jamal in West
Nathu Siwiya in South
Kot Ladha and Badoki Saikhwan in North.
In the South part of village, a little population locally known  as the ‘’’Jammu Dera’’’, or ‘’’New Abadi Chabba Sindhwan’’’.

History
Chabba Sindhwan is an ancient village. According to the locals, the Armies of Hindus Rajas and Mughal Empire, destroyed the village, that’s why the streets of village are not strait. Some houses are on height and some are on lower. Before the partition of India, both Muslim and Sikh communities were living. Now, the majority of population is Muslim.

Culture

Villagers follow the typical Punjabi Culture as well as modern western culture.

They spoke Punjabi Language, and can understand Urdu. They are mostly Mahajars.

Economy

Economy of village is very strong, GDP per capita is about 25000 as per 2020. Most of villagers are farmers. They produced Wheat, Rice, Water Melon, and many of vegetables.

Education

There is many Public and private sectors are spreading education in village.

Schools
Govt. High School Chabba Sindhwan
Govt. Girls High School Chabba Sindhwan
There are also some Islamic Institutes playing a key role in education sector.

Religions

There are 99.9% Muslims, and about 0.01% of Christians also living.

Nearby villages

Kot Ladha
Nokhar
Nadan Kot
Jhallan
Badoki Saikhwan

See also

Badoki Saikhwan
Udhowali
Kot Ladha

References

Villages in Gujranwala District